A list of films produced in the Soviet Union in 1936 (see 1936 in film).

1936

See also
1936 in the Soviet Union

External links
 Soviet films of 1936 at the Internet Movie Database

1936
Soviet
Films